Macromia margarita, the mountain river cruiser, is a species of dragonfly in the family Macromiidae. It is endemic to the United States.  Its natural habitat is rivers.

References 

Insects of the United States
Macromiidae
Insects described in 1947
Taxonomy articles created by Polbot